Ahmed Ali Kamel Mohamed Gharib (born 21 May 1986), is an Egyptian footballer who plays for Egyptian Premier League side National Bank of Egypt, and the Egyptian national team as a striker.

He was recalled to the Egyptian national team in May 2019, following an 8-year absence.

International career

International goals
Scores and results list Egypt's goal tally first.

References

1986 births
Living people
Egyptian footballers
Expatriate footballers in Saudi Arabia
Ismaily SC players
Al Hilal SFC players
Zamalek SC players
Wadi Degla SC players
Al Mokawloon Al Arab SC players
Association football forwards
Egyptian Premier League players
Saudi Professional League players
Asyut Petroleum SC players
ENPPI SC players
Egyptian expatriate footballers
Egyptian expatriate sportspeople in Saudi Arabia
2019 Africa Cup of Nations players
Egypt international footballers